GURPS Timeline is a sourcebook for the GURPS role-playing game.

Contents
The really interesting part of Timeline isn't the timeline itself but the short articles accompanying the more-or-less authenticated history. Included are speculation about the Lost Continents (later expanded into Atlantis) and a couple of tales about lost fortunes.

Publication history

Reception
Review: The Last Province (Issue 4 - June / July 1993)

References

External links
http://www.sjgames.com/gurps/books/Timeline/

Timeline
Role-playing game supplements introduced in 1992